This table displays the top-rated primetime television series of the 1972–73 season as measured by Nielsen Media Research.

References

1972 in American television
1973 in American television
1972-related lists
1973-related lists
Lists of American television series